Minerva is the Roman goddess of crafts and wisdom. The name may also refer to:

People
 Minerva (Daum Agora user), a South Korean netizen famous for his economic predictions
 Minerva Urecal (1894–1966), American film and television actress
 Minerva, the stage name of Josephine Blatt (c. 1869 – 1923)
 Minerva Hamilton Hoyt (1866–1945), an American activist famous for saving the deserts in California
 Minerva Brace Norton (1837–1894), American educator and author
Minerva Dayton Bateham (1856–1885), American poet, hymn writer, temperance worker

Geography

Australia 

 Minerva, Queensland, a locality in the Central Highlands

Pacific Ocean 

 Minerva Reefs, two submerged atolls between Tonga and New Zealand
Republic of Minerva, a self-declared South Pacific republic on the Minerva Reefs

United States 

Minerva, Kentucky, United States
Minerva, New York, United States
Minerva, Ohio, United States
Minerva, Oregon, United States
Minerva, West Virginia

Land development
 Minerva plc, a London-based British developer and property firm
 Minerva Building, a skyscraper once planned for the eastern edge of London's main financial district
 Lokhandwala Minerva, a skyscraper under construction in Mumbai, Maharashtra, India

Entertainment

Games
 MINERVA (mod), a modification for the video game Half-Life 2
 Minerva, a character in the final cutscene of Assassin's Creed II
 Minerva, a character in Fire Emblem: Shadow Dragon and the Blade of Light
 Minerva, a class in the MMORPG Elsword
 Ex Machina: Minerva, a character used by Celica A. Mercury in the fighting game series BlazBlue

Comics
 Doctor Minerva, a Marvel Comics character who is a Kree scientist
 Cheetah, a DC Comics character whose name is Barbara Ann Minerva
 Minxy Minerva, a Wildstorm character who has appeared in Welcome to Tranquility
 Minerva (Image Comics), a reincarnated goddess in The Wicked + The Divine

Film
 Minerva Film, an Italian film distribution company operating between 1912 and 1956

Manga and anime
 Minerva, a character from the Transformers franchise
 Minerva class battleship, a fictional class of space vessels from the anime series Mobile Suit Gundam SEED Destiny
 Fencer of Minerva, a hentai anime series
 Minerva Orland, a character in Fairy Tail
 Minene Uryuu, a character in Future Diary

Animation
 Minerva Campbell, the mother of Finn from Adventure Time
 Minerva Mink, a character from Animaniacs
 Minerva Mouse, the full name of Minnie Mouse

Music
 "Minerva" (song), a 2003 single by Deftones
 "Minerva", a 2005 song by Ani DiFranco, from her album Knuckle Down

Novels
 Minerva (Re:Zero), a character in the light novel series Re:Zero − Starting Life in Another World 
 Minerva Hadley, a character in the Noughts & Crosses book series by Malorie Blackman
 Minerva McGonagall, a character in the Harry Potter book series by J. K. Rowling
 Minerva Paradizo, a character in the book Artemis Fowl: The Lost Colony by Eoin Colfer
 Minerva, a ship and supporting character in The Baroque Cycle book series by Neal Stephenson
 Minerva, a setting in the book A World of Difference by Harry Turtledove
 Minerva, a setting in the Giants series by James P. Hogan
 Minerva, a computer which becomes a human female in Robert A. Heinlein's 1973 Time Enough for Love
 In Harry Turtledove's novel A World of Difference, the orbit of Mars is occupied by an Earth-sized planet called Minerva.

Theatre
 Minerva Theatre, Chichester, England, opened in 1989
 Minerva Theatre, Kolkata, India, built in 1893
 Minerva Theatre, Sydney, Australia 1939–1950
 Minerva, a character in the 1929 West End musical Mr. Cinders

Publications
 Minerva (German magazine), a nineteenth century journal published by Johann Wilhelm von Archenholz
 Minerva (archaeology magazine), an international review of ancient art and archaeology
 Minerva (Norwegian periodical), a Norwegian liberal conservative periodical first published in 1924
 Minerva (Springer journal), a peer-reviewed sociology journal established in 1962
Minerva (Welsh periodical), earliest title of Swansea History Journal
 Minerva Medica, a medical journal in Italian
Minerva, an intellectual magazine originally funded by the CIA via the Congress for Cultural Freedom

Science and technology

Astronomy and space
 93 Minerva, an asteroid discovered in 1867
 MINERVA mini-lander, a mini-lander on the unmanned spacecraft Hayabusa
 MINiature Exoplanet Radial Velocity Array (MINERVA), ground-based search for exoplanets 
 Minerva, a name originally proposed for the planet Pluto
 Minerva, the name of the European Space Agency's segment of the SpaceX Crew-4 mission

Automotive
 Minerva (automobile), a Belgian luxury automobile manufactured from 1902 until 1938
 Minerva Armored Car, a World War I armoured car

Biology
 Minerva (alga), a genus of red algae in the family Bangiaceae
 Minerva (bird), a genus of prehistoric owls

Computing and telecommunication
 MINERVA, a European Union organization concerned with the digitisation of cultural and scientific content
 MINERVA (cable system), a submarine telecommunications cable system linking Italy and Cyprus
 Minerva (QDOS reimplementation), a reimplementation of Sinclair QDOS
 Minerva Initiative, a plan that looks to tap into the community of area specialists and other university researchers
 Minerva Networks, a company that develops video compression technology and broadcast systems

Medicine
 Minerva cast, a type of orthopedic cast enclosing the patient's trunk and head
 A brand name of co-cyprindiol (cyproterone acetate/ethinylestradiol), an oral contraceptive

Physics
 MINERνA,  a neutrino scattering experiment

Ships
 , several ships
 , several ships of the British Royal Navy
 , several ships of the United States Navy
 , a class of ships of the Italian Marina Militare

Other uses
 Editura Minerva, a Romanian publishing house
 Minerva Bunkering, a marine fuel logistics company
 Minerva roundabout, famous landmark in Guadalajara, Jalisco
 The Minerva Initiative is a U.S. Department of Defense program
 Minerva F.C., a 19th-century amateur football club in England
 Fuji Xerox Minerva AFC, an American football team in Ebina, Kanagawa, Japan, playing in the X-League X2 division
 Minerva University, a private university based in San Francisco, California

See also
 Minerve (disambiguation)